Fårö or  in Gutnish is a Baltic Sea island just north of the island of Gotland, itself off mainland Sweden's southeastern coast. It is the second-largest island in the province and it is a popular summer resort. It has its own language, Faroymal, a dialect of Gutnish.

Fårö is also the name of the populated area consisting of both Fårö and Gotska Sandön islands. It comprises the same area as the administrative Fårö District, established on 1January 2016.

Geography

The island is separated from Gotland by the narrow Fårö-strait, and connected by two car ferries, operated by the Swedish Transport Administration.

On the islands of Fårö and Gotland are rock formations called rauk. They are a result of erosion during the Ice age and are unique to Gotland and Fårö.

The medieval Fårö Church is on Fårö. , Fårö Church along with Gotska Sandön Chapel on Gotska Sandön belongs to Fårö parish in Norra Gotlands pastorat.

One of the asteroids in the Asteroid belt, 9358 Fårö, is named after the island.

Etymology
The name Fårö (in Gutnish ) is derived from the words , meaning island, and probably , which is a word stem associated with travel like in the Swedish verb  ('to travel'). The word Fårö likely means 'the island one has to travel to' or 'the traveler's island'. That word is absent from Modern Gutnish, which uses the word  (which in Swedish means 'lamb').

Demographics

Military past

Carl Linnaeus spent two days in Fårö during the expedition in which he suveyed the strategic and military resources of Gotland. 

Until the 1990s, Fårö and the North of Gotland were off-limits to foreigners because of a government military installation there. There were large, multilingual signs at the side of the roads informing visitors of this and the prohibition was strictly enforced. After the Cold War ended, the installation (Swedish Coastal Artillery regiment KA 3) was mostly shut down.

Cinematic heritage
Swedish filmmaker Ingmar Bergman lived and died on Fårö and several of his films were filmed there, among them Through a Glass Darkly (1961), Persona (1966), Hour of the Wolf (1968), Shame (1968), The Passion of Anna (1969), and Scenes from a Marriage (1973), as well as Liv Ullmann’s Faithless (2000), based on a Bergman screenplay. The Bergman Week is a tribute to the filmmaker held on the island every June. Fårö itself is the subject of Bergman's documentary films Fårö Document (1970) and Fårö Document 1979.

Andrei Tarkovsky wanted to film The Sacrifice on Fårö but was denied access by the military, instead it was filmed further south on Gotland at När.

Mia Hansen-Løve filmed and set her film Bergman Island (2021) on Fårö.

Tourism
An annual event on Fårö is "Fårönatta" (Fårö Night), held in September, during which restaurants and bars stay open all night, craft stands are set up and the church holds a midnight Mass.

Places of interest

Digerhuvud 
The Digerhuvud coast with Bjärge nature reserve is the largest stack area in Sweden, with hundreds of stacks along a  part of the coast. Close by is the Helgumannen fishing village. The coast is not suited for swimming due to its depth (up to  close to the shore), and its strong currents.

An asteroid in the Asteroid belt, 10102 Digerhuvud, is named after the area.

Fårö Lighthouse
The Fårö Lighthouse lies on the island's northeastern point.

Langhammars
The Langhammars peninsula and the Langhammars nature reserve on north-western Fårö are rocky beaches with Ice age stone monoliths known as rauks. Langhammars was the setting for Ingmar Bergman's film Shame.

Sudersand
The long, sandy Sudersand beach on north-eastern Fårö lies next to Sudersands Semesterby which rents cabins to tourists.

References

External links

Objects from Fårö at the Digital Museum by Nordic Museum
 Gotland Tourist Association — Fårö

Gotland
Swedish islands in the Baltic
Islands of Gotland County
Military history of Sweden
Cultural heritage of Sweden
Cinema of Sweden
Ingmar Bergman